The MacBook Pro with Apple silicon is a line of Macintosh notebook computers first introduced in November 2020 by Apple Inc. It is the higher-end model of the MacBook family, sitting above the consumer-focused MacBook Air, and is currently sold with 13-inch, 14-inch, and 16-inch screens. All models use Apple-designed M series systems on a chip.

The first MacBook Pro with Apple silicon, based on the Apple M1, was released in November 2020.

The 14-inch and 16-inch MacBook Pros were released in October 2021. Powered by either M1 Pro or M1 Max chips, they are the first to be available only with an Apple silicon system on a chip. These models re-introduced elements from previous revisions which were removed in the 2016 Touch Bar MacBook Pro, such as MagSafe and hardware function keys.

13-inch with Touch Bar (2020–present) 
On November 10, 2020, Apple introduced a 13-inch MacBook Pro with two Thunderbolt ports based on the Apple M1 system on a chip, launched alongside an updated MacBook Air and Mac Mini as the first Macs with Apple's new line of custom ARM-based Apple silicon chips. The M1 13-inch MacBook Pro is externally identical to the previous Intel model. It adds support for Wi-Fi 6, USB4, and 6K output to run the Pro Display XDR. The number of supported external displays was reduced to one, as the previous Intel-based models supported two 4K displays. The FaceTime camera remains 720p but Apple advertises an improved Image signal processor for higher quality video.

On June 6, 2022, at WWDC 2022, Apple introduced the 13-inch MacBook Pro with two Thunderbolt ports based on the Apple M2 chip, instead of last generation M1. This launched alongside an updated MacBook Air, with new design, and also with the M2 chip. The specifications of the M2 MacBook Pro are almost the same, but it supports up to 24 GB of unified memory.

Reception 
CNN's review of the M2 MacBook Pro was generally positive, praising it as "one of the fastest laptops ever", but criticized some aspects of the design, noting the lower-priced M2 MacBook Air has a higher-resolution webcam, larger display and MagSafe charging. Testing by reviewers found the Solid-state drive in the base 256 GB M2 model to be significantly slower (read speeds 50% slower and write speeds 30% slower) than the 256 GB M1 model due to only having one NAND chip as opposed to two. Apple later confirmed to The Verge that the M2 MacBook Air with the same 256 GB storage also lacked a second NAND chip.

Technical specifications

14-inch and 16-inch (2021–present) 

At an online event on October 18, 2021, Apple announced redesigned 14-inch and 16-inch MacBook Pro models. They are based on the M1 Pro and M1 Max, Apple's second ARM-based systems on a chip and their first professional-focused chips. The new models addressed many criticisms of the Touch Bar MacBook Pro by re-introducing hard function keys in place of the Touch Bar, an HDMI 2.0 port, a SDXC reader and MagSafe charging. Other additions include a Liquid Retina XDR display with ProMotion supporting 120 Hz variable refresh rate, thinner display bezels and a 1080p webcam housed in an iPhone-like notch, Wi-Fi 6, Thunderbolt 4, and a six-speaker sound system supporting Dolby Atmos. The M1 Pro chip supports up to two external displays, both at 6K resolution, while the M1 Max chip supports up to four displays: three at 6K resolution, and one at 4K resolution. The 16-inch version is bundled with a 140 W GaN power supply that supports USB-C Power Delivery 3.1, though only MagSafe supports full-speed charging as the machine's USB-C ports are limited to 100 W.

On January 17, 2023, Apple announced updated 14-inch and 16-inch MacBook Pro models based on the M2 Pro and M2 Max chips. The updated models also include Bluetooth 5.3 and Wi-Fi 6E connectivity, HDMI 2.1, longer battery life, and up to 96GB of memory with M2 Max models.

Design 

The 14-inch and 16-inch MacBook Pro models feature a thicker and more-squared design than their immediate Intel-based predecessors. The keyboard features full-sized function keys, with the keyboard set in a "double anodized" black well. The MacBook Pro branding has been removed from the bottom of the display bezel and is engraved on the underside of the chassis instead. The models' appearance has been called reminiscent of the Titanium PowerBook G4 produced from 2001 to 2003. The models are available in silver or space gray finishes, similar to the previous Intel models. There was some criticism on social media that the MagSafe cable only came in silver and mismatched the space gray models.

Reception 
Reception to the 2021 MacBook Pro was generally positive. Online personalities such Justine Ezarik (iJustine), Anthony Young of Linus Tech Tips and Marques Brownlee praised the new design, the larger function keys, the new screen and M1 Pro and M1 Max. The Verge gave the models a 9.5/10 score, praising the increased speed and battery life, improved displays and speakers, and the removal of the Touch Bar, but criticized memory upgrade costs as "absurd" and noted only Apple's own apps seemed optimized for the GPUs.

IFixit gave the models a repairability score of 4/10, compared to just 1/10 for the Touch Bar MacBook Pro, saying that battery replacements are easier as it is no longer glued in, and the display as well as most ports are modular, though noted speakers are glued in and solid-state storage is permanently soldered (as before).

Technical specifications

Software and operating systems 
The MacOS operating system has been pre-installed on all Apple silicon MacBook Pro computers since release, starting with version MacOS Big Sur, which is the minimum required version of macOS that can and was made for Apple Silicon Macs.

See also 
 MacBook (2015–2019)
 MacBook Air

Timeline

References

External links 
  – official site

Computer-related introductions in 2020
Pro
ARM Macintosh computers